Arkansas Highway 222 (AR 222 and Hwy. 222) is an east–west state highway in Arkansas. The route of  runs from AR 51 near Donaldson east through Lono to AR 229. The route is two–lane, undivided.

Route description
Highway 222 begins at Highway 51 near Donaldson in Hot Spring County. The route runs through Rolla to intersect Highway 9 in Lono. The route continues further east to enter Grant County, when the route meets Highway 229 in Carvers and terminates. The route was partially paved in 1991.

Major intersections

References

222
Transportation in Grant County, Arkansas
Transportation in Hot Spring County, Arkansas